Sanja Vujović (née Damnjanović; born 25 May 1987) is a Serbian female handball player for CS Minaur Baia Mare.

Achievements
Slovenian Championship:
Winner: 2009
Slovenian Cup:
Winner: 2009
Serbian Championship:
Winner: 2010, 2011
Serbian Cup:
Winner: 2010, 2011
Croatian Championship:
Winner: 2012, 2013
Croatian Cup:
Winner: 2012, 2013
Danish Championship:
Winner: 2014
Danish Cup:
Winner: 2014
EHF Cup Winners' Cup:
Winner: 2014
World Championship:
Silver Medalist: 2013
European Championship:
Fourth place: 2012

Individual awards
All-Star Left Back of the European Championship: 2012
All-Star Left Back of the World Championship: 2013

References
 

  

Living people
1987 births
Handball players from Belgrade
Serbian female handball players
Expatriate handball players
Serbian expatriate sportspeople in Croatia
Serbian expatriate sportspeople in Denmark
Serbian expatriate sportspeople in Hungary
Serbian expatriate sportspeople in Slovenia
Serbian expatriate sportspeople in North Macedonia
Viborg HK players
Siófok KC players
RK Podravka Koprivnica players